Circular may refer to:

 The shape of a circle
 Circular (album), a 2006 album by Spanish singer Vega
 Circular letter (disambiguation)
 Flyer (pamphlet), a form of advertisement
 Circular reasoning, a type of logical fallacy
 Circular reference
 Government circular, a written statement of government policy

See also 
 Circular DNA (disambiguation)
 Circular Line (disambiguation)
 Circularity (disambiguation)